Maybole railway station was a railway station serving the village of Maybole, South Ayrshire, Scotland. The station was originally part of the Ayr and Maybole Junction Railway (worked and later owned by the Glasgow and South Western Railway).

History 

The station opened on 13 October 1856, and closed on 24 May 1860 when a new station with the same name opened to the south west on the Maybole and Girvan Railway.

The station was used as a goods station after closure to passengers.

References

Notes

Sources 
 

Disused railway stations in South Ayrshire
Former Glasgow and South Western Railway stations
Railway stations in Great Britain opened in 1856
Railway stations in Great Britain closed in 1860
Maybole